A minesweeper is a military vessel used to destroy naval mines.

Minesweeper may also refer to:
Minesweeper (film), a 1943 American film by William Berke
Minesweeper (video game)
Microsoft Minesweeper, the Windows version of the game
Jean-Luc Dehaene or The Minesweeper, Belgian Prime Minister from 1992 to 1999
"The Sweepers" (poem), also known as "Mine Sweepers", by Rudyard Kipling

See also
Demining